Nigel Charles Ashley Stevenson (born 2 November 1958) is a former Wales international footballer.

Club career

Stevenson began his career at his hometown side Swansea City, making his debut in 1976 in a match against Southport. He quickly established himself in the first team and stayed with the team throughout their rise from Division Four to Division One and their subsequent fall back down to Division Four. After reaching a decade at the club he was awarded a testimonial against Spanish side Real Sociedad, managed by his former Swansea manager John Toshack. However soon after Stevenson found himself ousted from the side and he spent time on loan at Cardiff City and Reading.

After impressing in Cardiff's battle against relegation during his loan spell at the end of the 1985–86 season, he joined the side on a permanent basis at the end of the following year on a free transfer, after making over 250 appearances for Swansea City. In his first season at Ninian Park, he helped the side to win promotion to Division Three and claim the Welsh Cup. He left the following year after making just over 70 appearances, moving into non-league football with Merthyr Tydfil. He later enjoyed spells at Llanelli, Maesteg Park and Haverfordwest County.

International career

During his career, Stevenson won four caps for Wales, making his international debut on 27 April 1982 in a 1–0 defeat against England. He made another three appearances in 1982, starting matches against Scotland, Northern Ireland and Norway.

Honours
Cardiff City

Division Four Runner-up: 1
 1987–88
Welsh Cup Winner: 1
 1987–88

References

External links
Welsh Premier League profile

1958 births
Living people
Footballers from Swansea
Welsh footballers
Wales under-21 international footballers
Wales international footballers
Association football defenders
Swansea City A.F.C. players
Cardiff City F.C. players
Reading F.C. players
Merthyr Tydfil F.C. players
Llanelli Town A.F.C. players
Barry Town United F.C. players
Maesteg Park A.F.C. players
Haverfordwest County A.F.C. players
Yeovil Town F.C. players
English Football League players
Cymru Premier players